Euphaedra luteolucens, the Gashaka-Gumpti Ceres forester, is a butterfly in the family Nymphalidae. It is found in Nigeria. The habitat consists of forests.

References

Butterflies described in 1995
luteolucens
Endemic fauna of Nigeria
Butterflies of Africa